Sankt Margarethen may refer to the following places:

Sankt Margarethen, Germany, a municipality in Schleswig-Holstein, Germany
in Austria:
Sankt Margarethen im Burgenland, in Burgenland
Sankt Margarethen im Lungau, in Salzburg
Sankt Margareten im Rosental, in Carinthia
Sankt Margarethen an der Sierning, in Lower Austria
Sankt Margarethen an der Raab, in Styria

See also:
Sankt Margrethen in Switzerland